An arboretum is a collection of trees.

Arboretum may also refer to:
Arboretum (Austin, Texas), a retail trade area in Austin, Texas
Arboretum (Washington, D.C.), a neighborhood of Washington, D.C.
The Arboretum, Nottingham, a residential area in Nottingham, England
Arboretum (Derby ward), an electoral ward in Derby, England
Arboretum (Nottingham ward), an electoral ward in Nottingham, England
Arboretum Zürich, is a botanical garden, public park and arboretum in the Swiss city of Zürich

See also
 Arbouretum, an American indie rock band